James Michael Slaton (born June 19, 1950) is a former pitcher with a 16-year career from 1971-1986.  He played in the American League with the Milwaukee Brewers from 1971–1977 and 1979–1983, the Detroit Tigers in 1978 and 1986, and the California Angels from 1984-1986.

Biography
Slaton played high school baseball at Antelope Valley High School and then played college baseball at Antelope Valley College.

He is the Brewers all-time leader in wins (117), innings  pitched (2025.1), games started (268), and shutouts (19), and he is third in strikeouts, trailing Teddy Higuera and Ben Sheets, and second in complete games, trailing Mike Caldwell.

Slaton was traded with Rich Folkers from the Brewers to the Tigers for Ben Oglivie at the Winter Meetings on December 9, 1977.

He represented the Brewers and the American League in the 1977 All-Star game and was the winning pitcher for the Brewers in the 4th game of the 1982 World Series against St. Louis.

After his playing career ended, he started coaching in the minor leagues. He coached in the Oakland Athletics organization (1992–1994) and then became the pitching coach for the Class A Daytona Cubs (1995–1996), Lancaster JetHawks (1997–98) and the Tacoma Rainiers (1999–2003). In 2004, he was a special assignment coach for the Seattle Mariners and from 2005-2007 he was the Mariners bullpen coach. Before coaching in the minor or major leagues, Jim coached an all-star team for the Monte Vista Little League, while pitching for the Angels.

He was the pitching coach for the Las Vegas 51s in 2008, also serving briefly as the bullpen coach for the Los Angeles Dodgers when Ken Howell temporarily left the team for medical reasons. After the season, the Dodgers announced that Slaton would be the pitching coach in 2009 for their new Triple-A affiliate, the Albuquerque Isotopes, a position he held through 2010. In 2011, he was named the pitching coach at Camelback Ranch.

References

External links

Jim Slaton at Baseball Library

1950 births
Living people
Águilas Cibaeñas players
American expatriate baseball players in the Dominican Republic
American League All-Stars
Antelope Valley High School alumni
Antelope Valley College alumni
Arizona Instructional League Pilots players
Baseball players from Long Beach, California
Billings Mustangs players
California Angels players
Clinton Pilots players
Detroit Tigers players
Evansville Triplets players
Fort Myers Sun Sox players
Los Angeles Dodgers coaches
Major League Baseball pitchers
Milwaukee Brewers players
Minor league baseball coaches
Seattle Mariners coaches
Sportspeople from Long Beach, California
Antelope Valley Marauders baseball players